Charles Derek Croxton (born 1969) is an American historian. He authored several articles on military and diplomatic aspects of the Thirty Years' War. Croxton wrote Peacemaking in Early Modern Europe: Cardinal Mazarin and The Congress of Westphalia, 1643–1648. He also worked as Adjunct Professor at Madonna College and has taught at Ohio State University and at Columbus State Community College.

Alongside Anuschka Tischer, he wrote The Peace of Westphalia: A Historical Dictionary. Most recently, he was the author of Westphalia: The Last Christian Peace.

Derek is also a game designer, having designed The King's Coalition, Battalion Commander, Congress of Westphalia and Archie's War, the latter being commercially published by Worthington Publishing.

External links
Review of one of Croxton's books
The Cabot Dilemma - a text by Derek Croxton
Exploring the European Past - A project in which Croxton worked
Geoffrey Parker's Curriculum Vitae - Contains reference to Croxton
Review of one of his books, and a book by Anuschka Tischer - In German
Reviews of A Historical Dictionary
Review of Peacemaking in Early Modern Europe

1969 births
21st-century American historians
American male non-fiction writers
Historians of Europe
Living people
Madonna University faculty
Ohio State University faculty
21st-century American male writers